The Catalonia national netball team represents Catalonia in international netball.

References

National netball teams of Europe
Netball